In Hindu philosophy, Brahmavadini ("women ascetics"), are women who strive for the highest philosophical knowledge of Brahman, that is, those who strive for greater universal consciousness. This is opposed to a Sadyovadhu, who is normally a sage's wife, and dedicated to domesticity and the welfare of her family. The Sanskrit word brahmavadini is the female equivalent of brahmavadi. According to Monier-Williams’s Sanskrit-English Dictionary, "brahmavādín" means ‘discoursing on sacred texts, a defender or expounder of the Veda, one who asserts that all things are to be identified with Brahman’. It doesn't mean "one who speaks like God".

Notable Brahmavadini
Notable Brahmavadini include: Vak Ambhrini, Lopamudra, Vishwawara, Sikta, Ghosha, and Maitreyi.

Lopamudra was the wife of the sage Agastya. A hymn in the Rigveda is attributed to her. 

Maitreyi, the wife of Yajnavalkya, is accredited with about ten hymns in Rig Veda.

Two suktas (hymns) of the tenth Mandala (book) of Rigveda, 39 and 40, each containing 14 verses, have been attributed to Ghosha. The first hymn praises the Ashvins while the second hymn is a personal wish expressing her intimate feelings and desires for married life.

See also
 History of education in the Indian subcontinent

References

Ancient Indian writers
Ancient Indian women writers